Per Stureson (born 22 March 1948) is a Swedish racecar driver. He was 1985 DTM champion.

Career
From 1984 to 1988 Stureson, participated in 55 DTM races. He won his first DTM race, driving a Volvo 240 Turbo. He won the 1985 Deutsche Produktionswagen Meisterschaft, driving a Volvo 240 Turbo. He won two races, three pole-positions and set two fastest laps.

References

External links
 https://www.driverdb.com/drivers/per-stureson/

1948 births
Deutsche Tourenwagen Masters champions
Deutsche Tourenwagen Masters drivers
Swedish racing drivers
Living people